Humboldt was a provincial electoral district for the Legislative Assembly of Saskatchewan, Canada. Located in central Saskatchewan, this constituency was one of 25 created for the 1st Saskatchewan general election in 1905.

Incorporated as a city in 2000, Humboldt (pop. 4,998) was the largest centre in the riding. Smaller communities in the district included the towns of Lanigan, Allan, Colonsay, Aberdeen, Clavet, and Bruno; and the villages of Vonda, Viscount, Muenster, and Meacham.

See also the mirrored article, which has information on the former federal electoral district of the same name.

Members of the Legislative Assembly

Election results

|-

 
|NDP
|Gord Bedient
|align="right"|1,807
|align="right"|23.24%
|align="right"|-4.77%

|- bgcolor="white"
!align="left" colspan=3|Total
!align="right"|7,775
!align="right"|100.00%
!align="right"|

|-

 
|NDP
|Brenda Curtis
|align="right"|2,456
|align="right"|28.01%
|align="right"|-12.07%
 
|Liberal
|Brent Loehr
|align="right"|1,048
|align="right"|11.95%
|align="right"|-6.04%

|- bgcolor="white"
!align="left" colspan=3|Total
!align="right"|8,770
!align="right"|100.00%
!align="right"|

|-

 
|NDP
|Bryan Barnes
|align="right"|3,291
|align="right"|39.89%
|align="right"|+4.89%
 
|Liberal
|Les C. Alm
|align="right"|1,495
|align="right"|18.12%
|align="right"|+0.97%

|- bgcolor="white"
!align="left" colspan=3|Total
!align="right"|8,250
!align="right"|100.00%
!align="right"|

|-

 
|NDP
|Armand Roy
|align="right"|2,978
|align="right"|35.00%
|align="right"|-6.41%
 
|Liberal
|Joanne Perrault
|align="right"|1,459
|align="right"|17.15%
|align="right"|-26.75%

|- bgcolor="white"
!align="left" colspan=3|Total
!align="right"|8,508
!align="right"|100.00%
!align="right"|

|-
 
| style="width: 130px"|Liberal
|Arlene Julé
|align="right"|3,594
|align="right"|43.90%
|align="right"|+6.37%
 
|NDP
|Armand Roy
|align="right"|3,390
|align="right"|41.41%
|align="right"|-20.38%
 
|Prog. Conservative
|David Leuschen
|align="right"|1,202
|align="right"|14.69%
|align="right"|+14.01%
|- bgcolor="white"
!align="left" colspan=3|Total
!align="right"|8,186
!align="right"|100.00%
|align="right"|

|-
 
| style="width: 130px"|NDP
|Eric Upshall
|align="right"|4,422
|align="right"|61.79%
|align="right"|+16.96%
 
|Liberal
|Arlene Julé
|align="right"|2,686
|align="right"|37.53%
|align="right"|+24.66%
 
|Prog. Conservative
|Dale Blair
|align="right"|49
|align="right"|0.68%
|align="right"|-41.62%
|- bgcolor="white"
!align="left" colspan=3|Total
!align="right"|7,157
!align="right"|100.00%
|align="right"|

|-
 
| style="width: 130px"|NDP
|Eric Upshall
|align="right"|3,914
|align="right"|44.83%
|align="right"|+0.76%
 
|Prog. Conservative
|Louis Domotor
|align="right"|3,693
|align="right"|42.30%
|align="right"|-7.73%
 
|Liberal
|Larry Benning
|align="right"|1,124
|align="right"|12.87%
|align="right"|+8.84%
|- bgcolor="white"
!align="left" colspan=3|Total
!align="right"|8,731
!align="right"|100.00%
|align="right"|

|-
 
| style="width: 130px"|Prog. Conservative
|Louis Domotor
|align="right"|4,480
|align="right"|50.03%
|align="right"|+18.66%
 
|NDP
|Edwin Tchorzewski
|align="right"|3,946
|align="right"|44.07%
|align="right"|-10.86%
 
|Liberal
||Liguori A. LeBlanc
|align="right"|361
|align="right"|4.03%
|align="right"|-9.67%

|- bgcolor="white"
!align="left" colspan=3|Total
!align="right"|8,955
!align="right"|100.00%
|align="right"|

|-
 
| style="width: 130px"|NDP
|Edwin Tchorzewski
|align="right"|4,272
|align="right"|54.93%
|align="right"|+14.46%
 
|Prog. Conservative
|John Bajbula
|align="right"|2,439
|align="right"|31.37%
|align="right"|-0.06%
 
|Liberal
|Peter Cline
|align="right"|1,065
|align="right"|13.70%
|align="right"|-14.40%
|- bgcolor="white"
!align="left" colspan=3|Total
!align="right"|7,776
!align="right"|100.00%
|align="right"|

|-
 
| style="width: 130px"|NDP
|Edwin Tchorzewski
|align="right"|3,006
|align="right"|40.47%
|align="right"|-11.85%
 
|Prog. Conservative
|Ray Perpick
|align="right"|2,334
|align="right"|31.43%
|align="right"|-
 
|Liberal
|Peter Cline
|align="right"|2,087
|align="right"|28.10%
|align="right"|-19.58%
|- bgcolor="white"
!align="left" colspan=3|Total
!align="right"|7,427
!align="right"|100.00%
|align="right"|

|-
 
| style="width: 130px"|NDP
|Edwin Tchorzewski
|align="right"|3,366
|align="right"|52.32%
|align="right"|+12.82%
 
|Liberal
|Mathieu Breker
|align="right"|3,067
|align="right"|47.68%
|align="right"|-2.95%
|- bgcolor="white"
!align="left" colspan=3|Total
!align="right"|6,433
!align="right"|100.00%
|align="right"|

|-
 
| style="width: 130px"|Liberal
|Mathieu Breker
|align="right"|3,693
|align="right"|50.63%
|align="right"|+0.91%
 
|NDP
|Palma Little
|align="right"|2,881
|align="right"|39.50%
|align="right"|+3.85%
 
|Prog. Conservative
|Frank J. Martin
|align="right"|720
|align="right"|9.87%
|align="right"|-4.76%
|- bgcolor="white"
!align="left" colspan=3|Total
!align="right"|7,294
!align="right"|100.00%
|align="right"|

|-
 
| style="width: 130px"|Liberal
|Mathieu Breker
|align="right"|4,226
|align="right"|49.72%
|align="right"|+1.70%
 
|CCF
|Sylvester E. Wiegers
|align="right"|3,030
|align="right"|35.65%
|align="right"|+2.43%
 
|Prog. Conservative
|Frank J. Martin
|align="right"|1,244
|align="right"|14.63%
|align="right"|+9.44%
|- bgcolor="white"
!align="left" colspan=3|Total
!align="right"|8,500
!align="right"|100.00%
|align="right"|

|-
 
| style="width: 130px"|Liberal
|Mary Batten
|align="right"|3,939
|align="right"|48.02%
|align="right"|+9.70%
 
|CCF
|George Thomas
|align="right"|2,725
|align="right"|33.22%
|align="right"|-3.32%
 
|Social Credit
|Conrad J. Lang
|align="right"|1,113
|align="right"|13.57%
|align="right"|-11.77%
 
|Prog. Conservative
|George B. Bailey
|align="right"|426
|align="right"|5.19%
|align="right"|-
|- bgcolor="white"
!align="left" colspan=3|Total
!align="right"|8,203
!align="right"|100.00%
|align="right"|

|-
 
| style="width: 130px"|Liberal
|Mary Batten
|align="right"|3,223
|align="right"|38.32%
|align="right"|+6.85%
 
|CCF
|Joseph William Burton
|align="right"|3,056
|align="right"|36.34%
|align="right"|-8.42%
 
|Social Credit
|Joseph Thauberger
|align="right"|2,131
|align="right"|25.34%
|align="right"|+1.57%
|- bgcolor="white"
!align="left" colspan=3|Total
!align="right"|8,410
!align="right"|100.00%
|align="right"|

|-
 
| style="width: 130px"|CCF
|Joseph William Burton
|align="right"|3,763
|align="right"|44.76%
|align="right"|+10.96%
 
|Liberal
|Arnold Loehr
|align="right"|2,646
|align="right"|31.47%
|align="right"|-2.74%
 
|Social Credit
|Joseph Thauberger
|align="right"|1,998
|align="right"|23.77%
|align="right"|-8.22%
|- bgcolor="white"
!align="left" colspan=3|Total
!align="right"|8,407
!align="right"|100.00%
|align="right"|

|-
 
| style="width: 130px"|Liberal
|Arnold Loehr
|align="right"|2,689
|align="right"|34.21%
|align="right"|-6.18%
 
|CCF
|Ben Putnam
|align="right"|2,657
|align="right"|33.80%
|align="right"|-20.40%
 
|Social Credit
|Joseph Thauberger
|align="right"|2,515
|align="right"|31.99%
|align="right"|-
|- bgcolor="white"
!align="left" colspan=3|Total
!align="right"|7,861
!align="right"|100.00%
|align="right"|

|-
 
| style="width: 130px"|CCF
|Ben Putnam
|align="right"|3,587
|align="right"|54.20%
|align="right"|+3.30%
 
|Liberal
|Arnold Loehr
|align="right"|2,673
|align="right"|40.39%
|align="right"|-8.71%
 
|Prog. Conservative
|Stephen D. Weese
|align="right"|358
|align="right"|5.41%
|align="right"|-
|- bgcolor="white"
!align="left" colspan=3|Total
!align="right"|6,618
!align="right"|100.00%
|align="right"|

|-
 
| style="width: 130px"|CCF
|Joseph William Burton
|align="right"|3,909
|align="right"|50.90%
|align="right"|+4.75%
 
|Liberal
|Charles Morton Dunn
|align="right"|3,771
|align="right"|49.10%
|align="right"|+0.41%
|- bgcolor="white"
!align="left" colspan=3|Total
!align="right"|7,680
!align="right"|100.00%
|align="right"|

|-
 
| style="width: 130px"|Liberal
|James Chisholm King
|align="right"|3,636
|align="right"|48.69%
|align="right"|-23.51%
 
|CCF
|Joseph William Burton
|align="right"|3,446
|align="right"|46.15%
|align="right"|+18.35%
 
|Social Credit
|John Joseph Lins
|align="right"|385
|align="right"|5.16%
|align="right"|–
|- bgcolor="white"
!align="left" colspan=3|Total
!align="right"|7,467
!align="right"|100.00%
|align="right"|

|-
 
| style="width: 130px"|Liberal
|James Chisholm King
|align="right"|4,540
|align="right"|72.20%
|align="right"|+6.34%
 
|CCF
|Joseph William Burton
|align="right"|1,748
|align="right"|27.80%
|align="right"|-6.34%
|- bgcolor="white"
!align="left" colspan=3|Total
!align="right"|6,288
!align="right"|100.00%
|align="right"|

|-
 
| style="width: 130px"|Liberal
|James Hogan
|align="right"|5,345
|align="right"|65.86%
|align="right"|+7.08%

|Farmer-Labour
|Joseph William Burton
|align="right"|2,771
|align="right"|34.14%
|align="right"|–
|- bgcolor="white"
!align="left" colspan=3|Total
!align="right"|8,116
!align="right"|100.00%
|align="right"|

|-
 
| style="width: 130px"|Liberal
|Henry M. Therres
|align="right"|3,251
|align="right"|58.78%
|align="right"|-3.34%
 
|Independent
|Jacob H. Riesen
|align="right"|2,280
|align="right"|41.22%
|align="right"|–
|- bgcolor="white"
!align="left" colspan=3|Total
!align="right"|5,531
!align="right"|100.00%
|align="right"|

 
|Liberal
|Arnold Loehr
|align="right"|1,618
|align="right"|37.88%
|- bgcolor="white"
!align="left" colspan=3|Total
!align="right"|4,271
!align="right"|100.00%

|-
 
| style="width: 130px"|Liberal
|Henry M. Therres
|align="right"|Acclaimed
|align="right"|100.00%
|- bgcolor="white"
!align="left" colspan=3|Total
!align="right"|Acclamation
!align="right"|
|align="right"|

|-
 
| style="width: 130px"|Liberal
|William Ferdinand Alphonse Turgeon
|align="right"|2,180
|align="right"|71.01%
|align="right"|-4.45%
 
|Conservative
|Alexander Donald MacIntosh
|align="right"|890
|align="right"|28.99%
|align="right"|+4.45%
|- bgcolor="white"
!align="left" colspan=3|Total
!align="right"|3,070
!align="right"|100.00%
|align="right"|

|-
 
| style="width: 130px"|Liberal
|William Ferdinand Alphonse Turgeon
|align="right"|1,073
|align="right"|75.46%
|align="right"|+6.03%
 
|Conservative
|Alexander Donald MacIntosh
|align="right"|349
|align="right"|24.54%
|align="right"|–
|- bgcolor="white"
!align="left" colspan=3|Total
!align="right"|1,422
!align="right"|100.00%
|align="right"|

|-
 
| style="width: 130px"|Liberal
|William Richard Motherwell
|align="right"|847
|align="right"|69.43%
|align="right"|-3.60%
 
|Independent
|Sinclair Elliott
|align="right"|373
|align="right"|30.57%
|align="right"|–
|- bgcolor="white"
!align="left" colspan=3|Total
!align="right"|1,220
!align="right"|100.00%
|align="right"|

 
| style="width: 130px"|Liberal
|David B. Neely
|align="right"|759
|align="right"|65.83%

|- bgcolor="white"
!align="left" colspan=3|Total
!align="right"|1,153
!align="right"|100.00%

|-
 
| style="width: 130px"|Liberal
|David B. Neely
|align="right"|Acclaimed
|align="right"|100.00%
|- bgcolor="white"
!align="left" colspan=3|Total
!align="right"|Acclamation
!align="right"|
|align="right"|

History

Members of the Legislative Assembly – Humboldt

External links 
Website of the Legislative Assembly of Saskatchewan
Saskatchewan Archives Board – Saskatchewan Election Results By Electoral District

Humboldt, Saskatchewan
Former provincial electoral districts of Saskatchewan